The Lake Elsinore Storm are a Minor League Baseball team of the California League and the Single-A affiliate of the San Diego Padres. The Storm plays their home games at Lake Elsinore Diamond (Pete Lehr Field), which opened in 1994; the park seats 7,866 fans.

History
This team relocated three times and has been traced back to the Redwood Pioneers, then the Palm Springs Angels, and finally the Lake Elsinore Storm. As the Palm Springs Angels and later as the Storm, it had previously been the "high-A" affiliate of the Angels until the end of the 2000 season (along with their former mascot, Hamlet), when it and the Rancho Cucamonga Quakes switched affiliations. Some former members of the Storm later became members of the Angels 2002 World Series championship team.

On May 18, 2007, the Storm set a league record for most lopsided victory, beating the Lancaster JetHawks by a 30–0 score.

Since the 2004 opening of Petco Park, the new home field of the Padres, the Storm have played one home game there toward the end of each season, as the second half of a doubleheader following a Padres daytime home game. Usually, its opponent has been the California League farm team of the Padres' same-day opponents.

In 2011, Nate Freiman played for the Storm setting single-season club records with 22 home runs and 111 RBIs.

On September 7, 2019, the Storm defeated the Rancho Cucamonga Quakes 11-2 to win the California League South Division Finals and advance to their sixth California League Championship Series. They faced the Visalia Rawhide, the champions of the North Division, losing the series 3-1.

In conjunction with Major League Baseball's restructuring of Minor League Baseball in 2021, the Storm were organized into the Low-A West. In 2022, the Low-A West became known as the California League, the name historically used by the regional circuit prior to the 2021 reorganization, and was reclassified as a Single-A circuit.

Roster

Notable alumni

 Dylan Axelrod
Josh Barfield
Kyle Blanks
Cody Decker
Steve Delabar
Darin Erstad
David Freese
Nate Freiman
Ernesto Frieri
Khalil Greene
Jedd Gyorko
Dirk Hayhurst
Chase Headley
Nick Hundley
Ben Johnson
Corey Kluber
John Lackey
Rymer Liriano
Xavier Nady
Wande Olabisi
Jake Peavy
Óliver Pérez
Robb Quinlan
Francisco Rodríguez
Tim Stauffer

References

External links

 
 Statistics from Baseball-Reference

Baseball teams established in 1980
Sports in the Inland Empire
San Diego Padres minor league affiliates
Anaheim Angels minor league affiliates
California Angels minor league affiliates
California League teams
Professional baseball teams in California